Ezio Sclavi (23 March 1903 – 31 August 1968) was an Italian footballer who played as a goalkeeper. He represented the Italy national football team three times, the first being on 13 December 1931, coming on as a substitute for an injured Gianpiero Combi, subsequently starting the two next matches, while Combi was recovering, the first being the occasion of a 1931–32 Central European International Cup match against Switzerland in a 3–0 home win.

Honours

Player
Juventus
Prima Divisione: 1925–26

International 
Italy
 Central European International Cup: Runner-up: 1931-32

References

1903 births
1968 deaths
Italian footballers
Italy international footballers
Association football goalkeepers
Serie A players
S.S. Lazio players
Juventus F.C. players